Hans Natorp (born 29 August 1964) is a Danish sailor. He competed in the men's 470 event at the 1988 Summer Olympics. On 21 June 2021, he was elected President of the National Olympic Committee and Sports Confederation of Denmark.

References

External links
 

1964 births
Living people
Danish male sailors (sport)
Olympic sailors of Denmark
Sailors at the 1988 Summer Olympics – 470
People from Sønderborg Municipality
Sportspeople from the Region of Southern Denmark